Cheque fraud (Commonwealth English), or check fraud (American English), refers to a category of criminal acts that involve making the unlawful use of cheques  in order to illegally acquire or borrow funds that do not exist within the account balance or account-holder's legal ownership. Most methods involve taking advantage of the float (the time between the negotiation of the cheque and its clearance at the cheque writer's financial institution) to draw out these funds. Specific kinds of cheque fraud include cheque kiting, where funds are deposited before the end of the float period to cover the fraud, and paper hanging, where the float offers the opportunity to write fraudulent cheques but the account is never replenished.

Types of cheque fraud

Cheque kiting

Cheque kiting full refers to use of the float to take advantage and delay the notice of non-existent funds.

Embezzlement 
While some cheque kiters fully intend to bring their accounts into good standing, others, often known as paper hangers, have pure fraud in mind, attempting to "take the money and run."

Bad cheque writing 
A cheque is written to a merchant or other recipient, hoping the recipient will not suspect that the cheque will not clear. The buyer will then take possession of the cash, goods, or services purchased with the cheque, and will hope the recipient will not take action or will do so in vain.

Check Conversion 
A cheque is endorsed by a non payee of the check and then cashed or deposited fraudulently. The non payee will then have cash free and clear, and will hope the true recipient will not find out until much later.

Abandonment 
The paper hanger deposits a cheque one time that they know is bad or fictitious into their account. When the bank considers the funds available (usually on the next business day), but before the bank is informed the cheque is bad, the paper hanger then withdraws the funds in cash. The offender knows the cheque will bounce, and the resulting account will be in debt, but the offender will abandon the account and take the cash.

Such crimes are often used by petty criminals to obtain funds through a quick embezzlement, and are frequently conducted using a fictitious or stolen identity in order to hide that of the real offender.

This form of fraud is the basis for the Nigerian cheque scam and other similar schemes; however, in these cases, the victim will be the one accused of committing such crimes, and will be left to prove their innocence.

Forgery 
Sometimes, forgery is the method of choice in defrauding a bank. There are three main types of cheque forgery: (a) Counterfeit. This is a cheque that has been created on non-bank paper to look genuine. It relates to a genuine account. (b) Forged signature. The cheque is genuine, but the signature is not that of the account holder. (c) Fraudulently altered. In this case a genuine cheque has been made out by the genuine customer but it has been altered by a fraudster, typically by altering the recipient’s name or by adding words and/or digits in order to inflate the amount. In England and Wales, section 64 of the Bills of Exchange Act of 1882 provides that where a bill or an acceptance is materially altered without the assent of all parties liable on the bill, the bill is made void except when used against a party who has himself made, authorised or assented to the alteration, and subsequent endorsers.

Other cases include that of Frank Abagnale, where the perpetrator passes or attempts to pass a cheque that has been manufactured by him/herself, but which represents a non-existent account.

Unusual cases 
Cheque washing involves the theft of a cheque in transit between the writer and recipient, followed by the use of chemicals to remove the ink representing all parts other than the signature. The perpetrator then fills in the blanks to his or her advantage.

Sometimes the cheque fraud comes from an employee of the bank itself, as was the case with Suzette A. Brock, who was convicted of theft for writing five corporate cheques to her own birth name from her desk as a loan servicing agent for Banner Bank of Walla Walla, WA.

The most notorious "bad cheque artist" of the 20th century, Frank Abagnale, devised a scheme to put incorrect MICR numbers at the bottom of the cheque he wrote, so that they would be routed to the incorrect Federal Reserve Bank for clearing. This allowed him to work longer in one area before his criminal activity was detected. In the movie Catch Me If You Can, which outlines Abagnale's crime spree, it shows Abagnale soaking plastic Pan Am airplanes in his bathtub and removing the Pan Am insignia on the toys. He would then place the decals on the bad cheques he was writing while pretending to be a Pan Am pilot. The film depicts Abagnale amassing over $2.5 million, while in reality he collected just under $1,500.

Combating cheque fraud
In most jurisdictions, passing a cheque for an amount of money the writer knows is not in the account at the time of negotiation (or available for overdraft protection) is usually considered a violation of criminal law. However, the general practice followed by banks has been to refrain from prosecuting cheque writers if the cheque reaches the bank after sufficient funds have been deposited, thereby allowing it to clear. But the account holder is normally held fully liable for all bank penalties, civil penalties, and criminal charges allowable by law in the event the cheque does not clear the bank.

Only when the successful clearance of a cheque is due to a kiting scheme does the bank traditionally take action. Banks have always had various methods of detecting kiting schemes and stopping them in the act. Computer systems in place will alert bank officials when a customer engages in various suspicious activities, including frequently depositing cheques bearing the same, large monthly total deposits accompanied by near-zero average daily balances, or avoidance of tellers by frequent use of ATMs for deposits.

New technology in place today may make most forms of cheque kiting and paper hanging a thing of the past. As new software rapidly catches illegal activity at the teller/branch level instead of waiting for the nightly runs to the back office, schemes are not only easier to detect, but may be prevented by tellers who deny customers illegal transactions before they are even started.

Part of how banks are combating cheque fraud is to offer their clients fraud protection services. Because it is impossible for banks to know every cheque that a customer writes and which may or may not be fraudulent, the onus is on the clients to make the bank aware of what cheques they write. These systems allow customers to upload their cheque files to the bank including the cheque number, the amount of money, and in some cases, the payee name. Now, when a cheque is presented for payment, the bank scrubs it against the information on file. If one of the variables does not match, then the cheque would be flagged as a potentially fraudulent item.

These services help with external fraud but they do not help if there is internal fraud. If an employee sends information to the bank with fraudulent items, then the bank would not know to deny payment. A system of dual controls should be put into place in order to not allocate all capabilities to one person.

Before the passage of the Check Clearing for the 21st Century Act, when cheques could take three or more days to clear, playing the float was fairly common practice in the US in otherwise-honest individuals who encountered emergencies right before payday.

Circular and abandonment frauds are gradually being eliminated as cheques will clear in Bank B the same day they are deposited into Bank A, giving no time at all for non-existent funds to become available for withdrawal. With image-sharing technology, the funds that temporarily become available in Bank A's account are wiped out the same day.

While there may still be some room for retail kiting, security measures taken by retail chains are helping reduce such incidents. Increasingly, more chains are limiting the amount of cash back received, the number of times cash back can be offered in a week or a given period of time, and obtaining transactional account balances before offering cash back, thereby denying it to those with low balances. For example, Walmart's policy is to determine account balances of those obtaining cash back, and some Safeway locations will not offer cash back on any accounts with balances under $250, even when funds are sufficient to cover the amount on the cheque. Customers who are noted to obtain cash back frequently are also investigated by the corporation to observe patterns.

Some businesses will also use the cheque strictly as an informational device to automatically debit funds from the account, and will return the item to the customer thereafter. However, in the United States this is done through the ACH Network; though faster than traditional cheque clearing, contrary to popular belief the ACH Network is not instantaneous. Though this practice reduces the room for kiting (by reducing float), it does not always eliminate it.

See also
Advance-fee scam
Bad check restitution program
Bank fraud
ChexSystems
Federal Bureau of Investigation
House banking scandal
Qchex
United States Secret Service
White-collar crime

References

Fraud
Banking
Commercial crimes
Confidence tricks
Negotiable instrument law
Non-sufficient funds

de:Scheckreiterei